Marion County is a county in the U.S. state of Kentucky. As of the 2020 census, the total population was 19,581. Its county seat is Lebanon. The county was founded in 1834 and named for Francis Marion, the American Revolutionary War hero known as the "Swamp Fox".

Geography

Marion County includes the geographic center of the state of Kentucky, which is located 3 miles NNW of Lebanon, just off KY 429. Marion County was formed in 1834 from part of Washington County.
Marion County is Kentucky's most Catholic county. The first Catholic settlers in Kentucky came to Holy Cross in the western part of the county circa 1790.

Adjacent counties
 Washington County  (north)
 Boyle County  (northeast)
 Casey County  (southeast)
 Taylor County  (south)
 LaRue County  (southwest)
 Nelson County  (northwest)

Demographics

As of the census of 2000, there were 18,212 people, 6,613 households, and 4,754 families residing in the county. The racial makeup of the county was 89.17% White, 9.12% Black or African American, 0.09% Native American, 0.43% Asian, 0.01% Pacific Islander, 0.35% from other races, and 0.82% from two or more races.  0.79% of the population were Hispanic or Latino of any race.

There were 6,613 households, out of which 35.60% had children under the age of 18 living with them, 53.80% were married couples living together, 13.70% had a female householder with no husband present, and 28.10% were non-families. 24.40% of all households were made up of individuals, and 10.10% had someone living alone who was 65 years of age or older.  The average household size was 2.58 and the average family size was 3.06.

By age, 25.20% of the population was under 18, 9.90% from 18 to 24, 30.30% from 25 to 44, 21.70% from 45 to 64, and 12.80%were 65 years or older.  The median age was 35 years. For every 100 females there were 102.30 males.  For every 100 females age 18 and over, there were 101.60 males.

The median income for a household in the county was $30,387, and the median income for a family was $35,648. Males had a median income of $27,826 versus $20,699 for females. The per capita income for the county was $14,472.  About 15.80% of families and 18.60% of the population were below the poverty line, including 21.80% of those under age 18 and 17.90% of those age 65 or over.

Communities
 Bradfordsville
 Gravel Switch
 Lebanon (county seat)
 Loretto
 Nerinx
 Raywick

Politics

See also

 National Register of Historic Places listings in Marion County, Kentucky

References

 
Kentucky counties
1834 establishments in Kentucky
Populated places established in 1834